Kenny Shaw (born January 15, 1992) is a professional Canadian football wide receiver who is currently a free agent. He played college football for the Florida State Seminoles. He has also been a member of the Cleveland Browns, Jacksonville Jaguars, Oakland Raiders, Toronto Argonauts, Ottawa Redblacks, and Saskatchewan Roughriders.

Early years
Shaw attended Dr. Phillips High School. Shaw was ranked a four-star prospect by Rivals in which he was 14th best wide receiver prospect in the country and 6th best overall prospect overall in the state of Florida. He was selected to the Florida Super 75 selected by the Times-Union. He was ranked 97th among Sporting News' Top 100 prospects.

College career
Shaw was a member of the Florida State Seminoles from 2010 to 2013. During his time at FSU, he won 3 ACC Atlantic division titles (2010, 2012 and 2013), 2 ACC conference championships (2012 and 2013) and 1 BCS National Championship (2013).  In 2013, he was selected to the Coaches All-ACC Third-team in his senior season. He finished college with a total of 124 Receptions, 1,919 receiving yards and 14 receiving touchdowns.

Professional career

Cleveland Browns
On May 12, 2014, Shaw signed with the Cleveland Browns as an undrafted free agent.

Jacksonville Jaguars
Shaw signed with the Jacksonville Jaguars on August 2, 2014. The Jaguars released Shaw on August 24, 2014.

Oakland Raiders
On December 10, 2014, Shaw was signed to the Oakland Raiders' practice squad.

Toronto Argonauts
On May 21, 2015, Shaw signed with the Toronto Argonauts of the Canadian Football League. He dressed in two games during the 2015 CFL season, making his regular season debut on August 14, 2015 against the Winnipeg Blue Bombers. In 2016, Shaw played in 17 games and registered his first 1000-yard season after catching 77 passes for 1004 yards and five touchdowns.

Ottawa Redblacks
On the first day of 2017 free agency, Shaw signed with the Ottawa Redblacks on February 14, 2017. Shaw struggled through numerous injuries in 2017, only managing to appear in three games catching six passes for 66 yards. Shaw was released by the Redblacks on April 3, 2018.

Saskatchewan Roughriders
On August 22, 2018, Shaw was added to the Saskatchewan Roughriders’ practice roster. He made three appearances for the Riders in 2018 catching 11 of 22 pass attempts for 153 yards. He was released by the club on January 2, 2019.

Edmonton Elks 
Following his release by Saskatchewan, Shaw signed with the Edmonton Eskimos but was subsequently released after the team's opening camp. After not playing during the 2019 season, Shaw was re-signed by the Eskimos on January 29, 2020. Shaw did not play in 2020 due to the 2020 CFL season being cancelled and was released on January 9, 2021. He re-signed with the Elks on February 10, 2021.

References

External links
Ottawa Redblacks bio
Florida State Seminoles bio
Toronto Argonauts bio

1992 births
Living people
American football wide receivers
Edmonton Elks players
Florida State Seminoles football players
Cleveland Browns players
Jacksonville Jaguars players
Ottawa Redblacks players
Toronto Argonauts players
Dr. Phillips High School alumni
Canadian football wide receivers
American players of Canadian football